Armenia participated in the Junior Eurovision Song Contest 2018 which took place on 25 November 2018 in Minsk, Belarus. The Armenian broadcaster Armenian Public Television (ARMTV) is responsible for organising their entry for the contest.

Background

Prior to the 2018 contest, Armenia had participated in the Junior Eurovision Song Contest eleven times since its first entry in 2007, with their best result being in  when they won with the song "Mama", performed by Vladimir Arzumanyan. Armenia went on to host the Junior Eurovision Song Contest 2011 in the Armenian capital Yerevan.

Before Junior Eurovision

Depi Mankakan Evratesil 2018
Depi Makankan Evratesil 2018 (Armenian: Դեպի Մանկական Եվրատեսիլ 2018; "Towards Junior Eurovision 2018") was the first edition of the national final Depi Makankan Evratesil and selected the Armenian entry for the Junior Eurovision Song Contest 2018. The competition commenced on 9 September 2018 with the first of two semi-finals and concluded with a winning song and artist during the final on 22 September 2018. All shows in the competition took place at the AMPTV studios in Yerevan, broadcast on Armenia 1 as well as online via the broadcaster's website 1tv.am.

Competing entries

The 23 selected singers were revealed in July 2018. The first 12 competing entries were revealed on 30 August 2018, with the remaining 12 revealed a day later.

Semi-finals

The semi-finals were held on 9 and 16 September 2018. Eleven artists took part in the first semi-final and twelve took part in the second semi-final, and five entries from both qualified to the grand final. Following both a public and a jury vote of two categories (adult and kids jury), the set of finalists was determined.

Final

The final was held on 22 September 2018. Following both a public and a jury vote of two categories (adult and kids jury), L.E.V.O.N was ultimately selected to represent Armenia in the Junior Eurovision Song Contest 2018.

Artist and song information

Levon Galstyan
Levon Galstyan (born on 20 May 2006) is an Armenian-Russian child singer. He represented Armenia at the Junior Eurovision Song Contest 2018 with the song "L.E.V.O.N".

Levon is no stranger to singing competitions, as in 2016 he participated in The Voice Kids Russia, where he was coached by Valeriy Meladze. Since then, he has taken part in local and international competitions, including New Wave in Russia as part of The Voices of Artsakh.

L.E.V.O.N
"L.E.V.O.N" is a song by Armenian-Russian child singer Levon Galstyan. He represented Armenia at the Junior Eurovision Song Contest 2018, finishing in 9th place with 125 points.

At Junior Eurovision
During the opening ceremony and the running order draw which both took place on 19 November 2018, Armenia was drawn to perform seventeenth on 25 November 2018, following Macedonia and preceding Wales.

Voting

Detailed voting results

References

Junior Eurovision Song Contest
Armenia
2018